The Seven Mosques is a complex of six small historic and often visited mosques in the city of Medina, Saudi Arabia. The complex consists of six mosques in spite of the name "Sab'ah" means "seven", because Saudis demolished one. Although the mosque is often visited by pilgrims, Saudi sources claim that there are no accounts in the order from the Islamic prophet Muhammad or in Sharia regarding the virtue of visiting these mosques. The prophet said: "You do not force yourself for preparation of visiting except these three mosques: Al-Masjid an-Nabawi, Masjid al-Haram, and Al-Aqsa Mosque. But recently there is a push towards saving this as cultural and religious heritage. Like referred below for Masjid Ali bin Abu Talib.

Location 
These mosques are located in south of Mount Sela which was the scene of the Battle of the Trench.

Mosques in the complex

Al-Fath Mosque 
This is the largest mosque of all, and it is located beneath of Mount Sala' on the western part. It is narrated that this mosque is named as "Al-Fath" due to the account of the prophet praying here during the Battle of the Trench, and the battle ended in Muslim victory (in Arabic, "Fath" or "Fatah" means "conquest" in Islamic context). The mosque was built during the time of the Caliph Umar bin Abdul Aziz, and renovated by the minister Saifuddin Abu al-Hija in 1154 during the time of the Sharifate of Mecca.

Salman Al-Farsi Mosque 
Located 20 meters south of Al-Fath Mosque, named after Salman Al-Farsi who led the construction of trenches during the Battle of the Trench. The mosque is built during the time of Caliph Umar bin Abdul Aziz, and renovated by the minister Saifuddin Abu al-Hija in 1154 during the time of the Sharifate of Mecca.

Abu Bakr As-Siddiq Mosque 
It is located 15 meters southeast of Salman Al-Farsi Mosque. These three mosques (Al-Fath Mosque, Salman Al-Farsi Mosque and Abu Bakr As-Siddiq Mosque) were demolished and renovated into one mosque with wider space.

Umar bin Khattab Mosque 
It is located 10 meters south of Abu Bakar As-Siddiq Mosque. This mosque is situated on higher altitude, and its look is corresponding to Al-Fath Mosque, thus it is considered that they were built and renovated at the same time.

Sa'd bin Mu'adh Mosque

Ali bin Abi Talib Mosque 
Located in the south of Fathimah Az-Zahra Mosque on a small hill. This mosque has a length of 8.5 meters and width of 6.5 meters. It is narrated that Ali joined the Battle of the Trench here. Today, local government of Medina is renovating this mosque while maintaining the original shape, and building a large park surrounding it as a decoration of the small building.

Fatimah Az-Zahra Mosque 
It is a small mosque attached to the others, with area of 4x3 meters. This mosque was built in the Ottoman period of the Hejaz Vilayet during the reign of Sultan Abdulmejid I.

See also
 List of mosques in Saudi Arabia
 Lists of mosques
 List of mosques in Medina

References 

Mosques in Medina